Redwing Coaches is a coach tour operator in London and Kent.

History

Redwing Coaches was founded in 1987 by Paul Campana. Initially based in Coldharbour Lane, in 2000 it relocated to Herne Hill. In July 2006, the business was sold to Addison Lee.

In April 2013, the business was purchased by Paul Hockley and Nigel Taylor in a management buyout. In June 2015, the Reliance Travel of Gravesend business was purchased.

Services
Redwing operates a commuter service from Gravesend to Canary Wharf and Central London. It operates day trips out of London under contract to Evan Evans Tours.

Fleet
As at November 2015 the fleet comprised 55 coaches.

References

External links

Showbus gallery

London bus operators
Transport in Kent
1987 establishments in England